Oberleutnant Josef Friedrich (born 18 September 1893, date of death unknown) was a World War I flying ace credited with seven aerial victories. He was born in Cvikov, Česká Lípa District. He scored most of his victories while flying as an observer with Raoul Stojsavljevic.

References

Sources

Austro-Hungarian World War I flying aces
People from Cvikov
1893 births
Year of death missing
Date of death unknown